Ponsford is an unincorporated community in Becker County, Minnesota, United States. It is west of Park Rapids on former Minnesota State Highway 225.

Minnesota State Highway 34 is nearby.

References

Unincorporated communities in Minnesota
Unincorporated communities in Becker County, Minnesota